Gurab (also Romanized as Gūrāb) is a village in Tulem Rural District, Tulem District, Sowme'eh Sara County, Gilan Province, Iran. At the 2006 census, its population was 535, in 136 families.

References 

Populated places in Sowme'eh Sara County